The Lincoln Highway Passaic River Bridge is a vehicular moveable bridge crossing the Passaic River at a point  from the river mouth at Newark Bay in northeastern New Jersey, United States. The vertical lift bridge, along the route of the Lincoln Highway, carries U.S. Route 1/9 Truck (at milepoint 0.67) and the East Coast Greenway between the Ironbound section of Newark and Kearny Point in Kearny. Opened in 1941, it is owned by and operated by the New Jersey Department of Transportation (NJDOT) and required by the Code of Federal Regulations to open on 4-hour notice for maritime traffic.

Location
The Lincoln Highway Bridge crosses the Passaic in the vicinity of Kearny Point Reach following the route that was once Newark Plank Road. The east bank at Kearny Point is an industrial and distribution warehouse area.  During the first half of the 20th century it was a site of yards of the Federal Shipbuilding and Drydock Company. At its western end there are connections to Raymond Boulevard, US Route 1/9, and the New Jersey Turnpike.

The bridge  and its sister, the Lincoln Highway Hackensack River Bridge are important components in the transportation of goods in the Port of New York and New Jersey. Since the nearby Pulaski Skyway prohibits trucks they often use Route 1/9 Truck to serve traffic at Port Newark, Newark Airport, the Holland Tunnel and the numerous intermodal freight transport facilities in the New Jersey Meadowlands. The NJDOT is considering building a new bridge along the alignment of the now defunct PD Draw, the former Newark and New York Railroad bridge at mile point 1.2. Studies are being conducted as part of an extensive project conceived to facilitate freight transshipment through the port known as Portway. A new bridge could include a rail component. The dual bridge combination would allow for two one-way crossings of the Passaic.

History

Approval for the bridge was given by the War Department in 1937. Construction began in 1939 and it was opened in January 1941. It was designed by the firm of Ash, Howard, Needles, and Tamman in conjunction with Morris Goodkind of the New Jersey Highway Department to incorporate many innovative concepts of the era.

See also
 List of crossings of the Lower Passaic River
 List of crossings of the Hackensack River
 List of bridges, tunnels, and cuts in Hudson County, New Jersey
 Lincoln Highway Hackensack River Bridge
 HNTB
 Waddell & Harrington

References

External links

Bridges completed in 1939
Lincoln Highway
East Coast Greenway
Bridges in Hudson County, New Jersey
Bridges in Newark, New Jersey
Vertical lift bridges in New Jersey
Road bridges in New Jersey
U.S. Route 1
U.S. Route 9
Bridges of the United States Numbered Highway System
Kearny, New Jersey
Steel bridges in the United States
1939 establishments in New Jersey